Drasco is an unincorporated community and census-designated place (CDP) in Cleburne County, Arkansas, United States, with a ZIP code of 72530. Drasco lies just northeast of Greers Ferry Lake and includes the lakeside community of Tannenbaum.

It was first listed as a CDP in the 2020 census with a population of 144.

Education 
Public education for elementary and secondary students is provided by Concord School District, Concord Elementary school, and Concord High School (located in Concord).

Demographics

2020 census

Note: the US Census treats Hispanic/Latino as an ethnic category. This table excludes Latinos from the racial categories and assigns them to a separate category. Hispanics/Latinos can be of any race.

References 

Unincorporated communities in Cleburne County, Arkansas
Unincorporated communities in Arkansas
Census-designated places in Cleburne County, Arkansas
Census-designated places in Arkansas